Cheshmeh Zangi (also Romanized as Cheshmeh Zangī or Kani Zanği) is a village in Kivanat Rural District, Kolyai District, Sonqor County, Kermanshah Province, Iran. At the 2006 census, its population was 124, in 28 families.

References 

Populated places in Sonqor County